Walsall Wood railway station was a station on the Midland Railway in England. It was opened in 1884, closed in March 1930 for passenger use although the odd DMU would serve the station from Birmingham New Street and Walsall.

The line from Walsall Wood to Brownhills Watling Street closed first along in 1960 and the section from Walsall Wood to Aldridge closed five years later in 1965 at the same time as Aldridge railway station closed. The station building was later demolished after falling into derelict condition.

The trackbed from Walsall Wood to Aldridge has since become a landfill site although the original road bridges near Coppice Road and Queen Street/Vigo Road are still in place and take the roads over the old trackbed. The section towards Brownhills Watling Street has become a housing estate. Oak Park also occupy sections of the old trackbed for leisure use and the original station is now a playground.

References

Disused railway stations in Walsall
Railway stations in Great Britain opened in 1884
Railway stations in Great Britain closed in 1930
Former Midland Railway stations